Convos with My 2 Year Old is a YouTube web series and channel. The series was created by Matthew Clarke and is sponsored by GEICO and produced by CocoMilk Productions (originally known as Warmland Films).

Synopsis 
Each episode is contains a true-to-life conversation that Matthew Clarke had with his daughter, Coco Frances Harrison-Clarke, and in later seasons, his son, Shepherd Harrison-Clarke. Matthew Clarke is cast as himself, but his children are portrayed by Clarke's friends David Milchard and Michael P. Northey, who are dressed similarly to their roles in each episode. Clarke's family, Coco, Shepherd, and his wife Leila Harrison, have all made numerous cameos in the web series cast. The captions "Actual conversations with my 2 year old daughter..." appear at the beginning of each episode. "As re-enacted by me and another full grown man" appears at the beginning of each episode.

Cast 
 David Milchard as Coco Frances Harrison-Clarke
 Michael P. Northey as Shepherd Harrison-Clarke
 Matthew Clarke as himself
 Coco Frances Harrison-Clarke as herself
 Shepherd Harrison-Clarke as himself
 Leila Harrison as herself

Episode List 
Episodes in the YouTube Series:

Reception 
In an interview with The Huffington Post, Clarke expressed that his idea for the web series came after he had a conversation with his daughter and realized that if she were bigger or an adult, the things that she stated would more than likely be unacceptable to say. Clarke also stated, in an interview with the Daily Dot, that much of the humor is satirical: "Kids have this natural vulnerability about them, they’re these innocent, pristine creatures, in a selfish narcissistic way...David doesn’t have that. When you take away that innocence and you’re left with the narcissistic, selfish qualities, it highlights the absurdity of these interactions." The series also highlights the sort of relationship that parents can have with their toddlers.

Convos with My 2 Year Old became a success with nearly 800,000 subscribers. However it is difficult to pinpoint exactly when it became popular as the owner of the Convos with 2-Year-Old channel has disabled viewers from seeing the stats of the first few episodes. The series has a majority of YouTube "Likes" rather than "Dislikes" and all have more than 44,000 views each. The first episode of the series has more than 12,000,000 views and is the most-viewed out of the series. It is difficult to come across negatives about series because the YouTube channel deletes any negative comments on any of the videos and most articles are positive towards the series.

The series has no definite type of viewer, but it can be observed to be favored by an audience of parents with families. Many articles about the web series are under the "Family" and "Parents" category.

Notes

References 

 

2010s YouTube series
2013 web series debuts
YouTube channels launched in 2013